Mi Niña Bonita is the second studio album released by the Venezuelan reggaeton duo Chino & Nacho. It was released on 6 April 2010. It has 12 tracks, 2 featuring guest stars like Don Omar and Baroni.

Track listing

Charts

Weekly charts

Year-end charts

Sales and certifications

Mi Niña Bonita: Reloaded

Mi Niña Bonita: Reloaded is a re-edition of the Mi Niña Bonita released on 24 August 2010.

Track listing
 Tu Angelito
 Mi Niña Bonita
 Se Apagó La Llama (feat. R.K.M & Ken-Y)
 Friday
 Lo Que No Sabes Tú (feat. El Potro Álvarez & Baroni)
 Me Mata, Me Mata
 La Pastillita
 Dentro de Mí (feat. Don Omar)
 Ese Hombre Soy Yo
 Voy a Caer En La Tentación
 Una Oportunidad
 Contigo
 You Make Me Feel (Higha) (feat. Baroni)
 Niña Bonita (Dance Remix)
 Niña Bonita (Urban Remix) (feat. Angel & Khriz)
 Niña Bonita (Banda Version) (feat. Dareyes de la Sierra)
 Boleto de Amor
 Cuando Se Muere El Amor

See also
List of number-one Billboard Latin Rhythm Albums of 2010

References

External links
 https://itunes.apple.com/us/album/mi-nina-bonita/id364291602
 https://web.archive.org/web/20100512130830/http://www.chinoynacho.com.ve/

2010 albums
Machete Music albums
Latin Grammy Award for Best Urban Music Album
Chino & Nacho albums